Padma Viswanathan (born 1968 Nelson, British Columbia) is a Canadian playwright and fiction writer.

Life
She graduated from University of Alberta, and received an MA from the Writing Seminars at Johns Hopkins University in 2004 and an MFA from the University of Arizona in 2006.

Her short stories have appeared in Subtropics, New Letters, PRISM international, Boston Review, and Malahat Review.

She lives in Fayetteville, Arkansas, with her husband, the poet/translator Geoffrey Brock, and their two children.

Awards
Her story "Transitory Cities" won the 14th annual Boston Review Short-Story Contest in 2007, judged by George Saunders.

Her novel The Ever After of Ashwin Rao was shortlisted for the Scotiabank Giller Prize.

In 2017 she won Arkansas's Porter Prize.

Works

Short stories

Novels
 , takes place in South India in the first half of the twentieth century.
 , explores the aftermath of the 1985 bombing of an Air India flight.

Plays
 "House of Sacred Cows," originally produced by Northern Light Theatre in Edmonton and later published in the volume Ethnicities: Plays from the New West (1999)
 "By Air, By Water, By Wood", Frog and Nightgown Productions 2000, published South Asian Review, 2008

Radio plays
 "Disco Does Not Suck", CBC Radio, 1999

Anthologies

Translations
  by Graciliano Ramos, New York Review of Books Classics, 2020

Review
In the introduction to her stunning first novel, Padma Viswanathan describes her grandmother’s faltering attempts to recount their family history. “This time, she started farther back,” she writes of one occasion, “with a story I’d never heard: of her own grandmother, married as a child and widowed before she was out of her teens; of that grandmother’s son, childless and embittered; and her daughter, my grandmother’s mother, victimized by her marriage.” After trips to India, enormous amounts of research, and not a little invention, the result is The Toss of a Lemon.

References

External links 
Official site
Author's blog
"Questions for Padma Viswanathan", October 11, 2008, Sepia Mutiny
"PADMA VISWANATHAN (1968 - )", doollee

1968 births
Living people
Canadian women novelists
Canadian women dramatists and playwrights
University of Alberta alumni
Johns Hopkins University alumni
University of Arizona alumni
Canadian writers of Asian descent
Canadian people of Indian descent
21st-century Canadian dramatists and playwrights
21st-century Canadian women writers
People from Nelson, British Columbia